Putyata (Russian: Путята) was the first tysyatsky of Novgorod whose name is found in Slavonic chronicles. According to the Ioachim Chronicle, he was active during the reign of Vladimir the Great and forced the Novgorodians to accept Christian faith "by sword", while the posadnik Dobrynya forced them into Christianity "by fire".

References
1: 

10th-century births
Year of death unknown
10th-century Rus' people
People from medieval Novgorod
Russian knights
Persecution of Pagans